Mark Randall McCumber (born September 7, 1951) is an American professional golfer who has played on the PGA Tour and Champions Tour.

McCumber was born and raised in Jacksonville, Florida, where he attended Robert E. Lee High School. He turned professional in 1974 and joined the PGA Tour in 1978. McCumber won ten times on the PGA Tour between 1979 and 1994 including the prestigious Players Championship (1988) and Tour Championship (1994). He also won the World Cup for the United States in partnership with Ben Crenshaw in 1988. He played on the 1989 Ryder Cup team.

McCumber worked as an on-course reporter for NBC Sports in 1991 and for ABC Sports part-time in 1998 and full-time in 1999.

After turning 50 in 2001, McCumber played on the Champions Tour from 2001 to 2008, but did not win an event in this venue. He also works as a golf course architect and was occasionally featured as a golf analyst on Fox Sports. McCumber is a member of the American Society of Golf Course Architects.

McCumber and his wife, Paddy, have two daughters and a son. Their son, Tyler, is also a professional golfer. McCumber is a devout Jehovah's Witnesses who preaches in his spare time.

Professional wins (11)

PGA Tour wins (10)

PGA Tour playoff record (2–0)

Other wins (1)

Results in major championships

CUT = missed the half-way cut
WD = withdrew
"T" indicates a tie for a place

Summary

Most consecutive cuts made – 9 (twice)
Longest streak of top-10s – 1 (five times)

The Players Championship

Wins (1)

Results timeline

CUT = missed the halfway cut
DQ = disqualified
"T" indicates a tie for a place.

U.S. national team appearances
Professional
Dunhill Cup: 1988
World Cup: 1988 (winners), 1989
Ryder Cup: 1989 (tied)

See also 

 Spring 1978 PGA Tour Qualifying School graduates

References

External links

McCumber Golf - his golf course design company
American Society of Golf Course Architects profile

American male golfers
PGA Tour golfers
PGA Tour Champions golfers
Ryder Cup competitors for the United States
Golf course architects
Golfers from Jacksonville, Florida
American Jehovah's Witnesses
Robert E. Lee High School (Jacksonville) alumni
1951 births
Living people